Adrian Howard "Odie" Smith (born October 5, 1936) is an American former professional basketball player.

Early life
Smith was the fifth of six children of Oury and Ruth Smith of Farmington, Kentucky. The family lived in a farmhouse that had no electricity and no indoor plumbing. He was nicknamed "Odie" after a comedian on the Grand Ole Opry. As a child, he attended a three-room schoolhouse in rural Graves County, Kentucky. Because the family didn't have money for a basketball, he learned to shoot one his mother made from rolling up his dad's socks. 

He attended Farmington High School, where he nearly didn't play high school basketball until the school's principal and basketball coach agreed to give him a ride home, a distance of seven miles, after practices. As a senior, his only scholarship offer was from nearby Murray State University, but he took too long to accept and the offer was withdrawn.

College career

Smith enrolled to play basketball at Northeast Mississippi Junior College (now known as Northeast Mississippi Community College). After Smith excelled on the court, Northeast coach Bonner Arnold convinced legendary University of Kentucky coach Adolph Rupp to send a scout to see Smith, and UK offered a scholarship.

Smith didn't see much action his junior season until Kentucky's star guard, Vernon Hatton, went out with an appendectomy, and for seven games, Smith averaged 16.3 points. As a senior, Smith was a starter and averaged 12.4 points per game. The Wildcats' team, known as the "Fiddlin' Five", beat Seattle University 84-72 to win the 1957–58 national championship, led by 30 points from Hatton and 24 from Johnny Cox. Smith averaged just under 14 points in UK's four NCAA tourney wins, including seven in the championship game.

Smith graduated from Kentucky with a business degree.

After college
He was selected in the 1958 NBA draft, but not until the 15th round (85th overall) by the Cincinnati Royals. Instead of attempting to make the Royals, he joined the U.S. Army, where he played on the Army's all-star team and in 1960 was selected to play on the eventual undefeated U.S. men's basketball team that won the gold medal in the 1960 Olympics in Rome, Italy. The team went 8-0 in the Olympics, led by future hall-of-famers Oscar Robertson, Jerry Lucas, and Jerry West, although in the opening win against host Italy, Smith was the team's leading scorer, with 17 points scored. The team's average margin of victory in the eight games was 42.4 points per game.

Professional career
Smith began his professional career in the 1961–62 NBA season. During his first three seasons, he served as a backup guard behind Oscar Robertson and Bucky Bockhorn, averaging about 20 minutes per game with scoring averages of 7.2, 8.9, and 9.4, respectively.

In his fourth season of 1964–65, he became a starter in the Royals' backcourt alongside Robertson. Playing over 34 minutes per game, he averaged 15.1 points per game, with a .456 field goal percentage and .830 free throw percentage.

The 1965–66 season was both his most productive and noteworthy. He averaged a career-high 18.4 points and 3.6 rebounds per game as the Royals went 45-35 and, in the Eastern Division semifinals, extended the Boston Celtics to a fifth and deciding game before falling to the eventual NBA champions. On December 15 he scored a career-high 34 points against the Celtics, and followed that up on January 5 with another career-high of 35 points. During the season, Smith was selected to the 1966 NBA All-Star Game and, surprisingly for a game that including sixteen future Hall-of-Famers, Smith was named MVP after he scored 24 points in 26 minutes. It was his only All-Star appearance, and for winning the MVP award, he received a new Ford Galaxie car.

In his sixth NBA season, 1966–67, Smith averaged 16.6 points per game and led the NBA with a .903 free throw percentage and, for the fourth time, the durable Smith led the league in games played. In 1967–68, Smith averaged 15.6 points per game in his last year as a starter. In 1968–69, playing primarily as a backup to Robertson and Tom Van Arsdale, Smith averaged 9.6 ponts per game.

In the 1969–70 season, after 32 games with the Royals, Smith was traded to the San Francisco Warriors, for whom he played another 45 games, averaging 5.9 points per game for the season. In 1970–71, his 10th NBA season, he played only 21 games, averaging 5.3 points per game in his final NBA season.

In 1971–72 he played for the American Basketball Association's Virginia Squires, averaging 5.1 points per game. He also played 13 times for the United States.

Honors
The entire 1960 USA Olympic basketball team, including Smith, was inducted into the Naismith Memorial Basketball Hall of Fame on August 13, 2010. Smith is also a member of the Northeast Mississippi Community College Sports Hall of Fame and the Mississippi Community College Sports Hall of Fame.

Life after basketball
After 11 seasons of playing professional basketball, Smith became a banker, working for many years as a commercial relationship manager for Cincinnati-based Fifth Third Bank. He currently is a vice president for Fifth-Third Bank. He resides in Cincinnati with his wife, Paula, in the only house they've ever owned—and he still has the Ford Galaxie he won from the 1966 NBA All-Star Game.

NBA/ABA career statistics

Regular season

Playoffs

References

External links
NBA stats @ databasebasketball.com
One-on-One with Adrian Smith
The Mississippi Community College Sports Hall of Fame
Northeast Mississippi Community College Sports Hall of Fame
1960 United States Olympic Team page at The Naismith Memorial Basketball Hall of Fame

Book, Cincinnati's Basketball Royalty by Gerry Schultz

1936 births
Living people
Amateur Athletic Union men's basketball players
American bankers
American men's basketball players
Basketball players at the 1959 Pan American Games
Basketball players at the 1960 Summer Olympics
Basketball players from Kentucky
Cincinnati Royals draft picks
Cincinnati Royals players
Northeast Mississippi Tigers basketball players
Kentucky Wildcats men's basketball players
Medalists at the 1960 Summer Olympics
National Basketball Association All-Stars
Olympic gold medalists for the United States in basketball
Pan American Games gold medalists for the United States
Pan American Games medalists in basketball
People from Graves County, Kentucky
Shooting guards
San Francisco Warriors players
United States men's national basketball team players
Virginia Squires players
Medalists at the 1959 Pan American Games